The Bălăria is a right tributary of the river Neajlov in Romania. It flows into the Neajlov in Singureni.

References

Rivers of Romania
Rivers of Giurgiu County